This is a list of people who have served as Lord Lieutenant of County Tyrone. 

There were lieutenants of counties in Ireland until the reign of James II, when they were renamed governors. The office of Lord Lieutenant was recreated on 23 August 1831.

Governors

Thomas Knox, 1st Viscount Northland: –1818
John Hamilton, 1st Marquess of Abercorn: –1818
Somerset Lowry-Corry, 2nd Earl Belmore: –1831
Du Pre Alexander, 2nd Earl of Caledon: –1831
Charles Gardiner, 1st Earl of Blessington: –1829 (died 1829)

Lord Lieutenants
The 2nd Earl of Caledon: 17 October 1831 – 8 April 1839
The 2nd Earl of Charlemont: June 1839 – 26 December 1863
The 3rd Earl of Charlemont: 3 March 1864 – 12 January 1892
The 4th Earl Belmore: 10 February 1892 – 6 April 1913
Edward Archdale: 5 August 1913 – 4 July 1916
The 3rd Duke of Abercorn: 26 April 1917 – 1945
James Ponsonby Galbraith: 25 September 1945 – 1 October 1950
The 4th Duke of Abercorn: 8 January 1951 – 1979
John Hamilton-Stubber: 1 March 1979 – 3 October 1986
The 5th Duke of Abercorn: 20 March 1987 – 4 July 2009
Robert Lowry Scott: 5 July 2009 – present

Deputy lieutenants
A deputy lieutenant of Tyrone is commissioned by the Lord Lieutenant of Tyrone. Deputy lieutenants support the work of the lord-lieutenant. There can be several deputy lieutenants at any time, depending on the population of the county. Their appointment does not terminate with the changing of the lord-lieutenant, but they usually retire at age 75.

21st Century
24 March 2010: Countess Castle Stewart

References

 
Tyrone

Northern Ireland-related lists